Sakaki or Cleyera japonica is an evergreen tree native to Japan.

Sakaki may also refer to:

 Sakaki (Azumanga Daioh), a character from the manga and anime series Azumanga Daioh
 Giovanni (Pokémon), known as Sakaki in Japan, a character from the Pokémon series
 Yuko Sakaki, a character from Battle Royale
 Sakaki, a character in the .hack//G.U. franchise
 Sakaki, Nagano, a town located in Hanishina District, Nagano, Japan
 Nanao Sakaki, the Japanese poet
 Sakaki, two destroyers of Japan
 Yuya Sakaki, a fictional character from the Yu-Gi-Oh! Arc-V

Japanese-language surnames